The 2010 European Pairs Speedway Championship was the seventh UEM European Pairs Speedway Championship season. The Final took place on 18 September 2010 in Stralsund, Germany. The Championship was won by the defending Champion Czech Republic who beat host team Germany and Croatia.

Results

Heat details

Semi-Final One 
  Rivne
 17 July 2010
 Rivenenskyy Mototrek (Length: 360 m)
Referee and Jury President:  Frank Ziegler
References 
Changes:
 → Ukraine B
 → Ukraine C

Semi-Final Two 
  Opole
 21 August 2010
 Speedway Stadium (Length: 321 m)
Referee and Jury President:  Istvan Darago
References 
Change:
 → Poland B

The Final 
  Stralsund
 18 September 2010
Paul – Griefzu – Stadion (Length: 385 m)
Referee:  Wojciech Grodzki
Jury President:  C. Bergstrom
References

See also 
 2010 Individual Speedway European Championship
 2010 in sports

References 

2010
European Pairs